Fritz Inthaler (born 19 March 1937) is a former Austrian cyclist. He competed in the individual road race and team time trial events at the 1960 Summer Olympics. His brother, Franz Inthaler, was also a cyclist.

References

External links
 

1937 births
Living people
Austrian male cyclists
Olympic cyclists of Austria
Cyclists at the 1960 Summer Olympics
Cyclists from Vienna
20th-century Austrian people